Mariana Nolasco (born February 9, 1998) is a singer, songwriter, YouTuber, and Brazilian actress.

Career
Nolasco was inspired to play music by her brother. She started learning guitar aged 13 and began uploading videos of her performing music onto Facebook. She achieved widespread popularity in Brazil after the performances on her YouTube channel went viral. She has since collaborated with Boyce Avenue and Jota Quest.

In 2018, she embarked on a mini-tour of Brazil, covering ten states in 25 shows over two months. All gigs sold out.

Filmography 
In addition, Mariana participated in the film "Two Brothers" (2004), directed by Luiz Fernando Carvalho, that was released on Rede Globo.

Awards and nominations
In 2017, she was nominated for the Multishow Brazilian Music Award for Best Web Cover.

References

External links

 

1998 births
Living people
20th-century Brazilian actresses
Actresses from São Paulo (state)
Brazilian television actresses
Brazilian telenovela actresses
Actresses from São Paulo
Brazilian women pop singers
Brazilian pop singers
Brazilian women singer-songwriters
Brazilian singer-songwriters
Brazilian songwriters
21st-century Brazilian singers
21st-century Brazilian women singers